Paul Irish is an American front-end engineer and a developer advocate for the Google Chrome web browser. He is a evangelist in web technologies, including JavaScript and CSS. In 2011, he was named Developer of the Year by The Net Awards for his contributions to the web development landscape and his participation in many popular open source projects.

Front-end development 

Irish has created, contributed to, or led the development of many front-end web development projects and JavaScript libraries:
Google Lighthouse, a tool for automated webpage quality analysis performance metrics and recommendations
Chrome DevTools, the developer tools built into Google Chrome
 Modernizr, a feature detection library for HTML5 and CSS3 features
 Yeoman, a suite of tools for a web development workflow
 HTML5 Boilerplate, a template for HTML5 and CSS3 front-end development
Bower, a package manager for web developers
 jQuery, a JavaScript library that abstracts DOM manipulation and traversal, animation, event handling, and other common JavaScript tasks

HTML5 evangelism 

Irish has created or was a key contributor to many websites in an effort to encourage browser and web developers to move to HTML5:

Move The Web Forward, a website encouraging web developers to learn more and participate in the development community
 W3Fools, a website dedicated to educating the web developer community about the problems with W3Schools, a popular web technology reference resource
 WebPlatform, a collaboration to create a comprehensive web technology documentation wiki similar to the Mozilla Developer Network. Participants include the W3C, Google, Microsoft, Mozilla, Facebook, and others
Chrome Status, documentation of which HTML5 features have been implemented in Chrome and Chrome for Android
HTML5 Readiness, a visualization of which HTML5 and CSS3 features have been implemented in which browsers
HTML5 Rocks, a website dedicated to HTML5 education, tutorials, news, and more
CSS3 Please, a tool for interactively learning and developing CSS3
HTML5 Please, a reference for HTML5 features and when and how it is safe to use them in production code

References

External links 
 

1982 births
Living people
American bloggers
Computer programmers
Web developers
American computer programmers
Google employees
People associated with JavaScript